Matija Gluščević (born 13 June 2004) is a Serbian footballer who currently plays as a right-back for Proleter Novi Sad.

Career statistics

Club

References

2004 births
Living people
Serbian footballers
Serbia youth international footballers
Association football defenders
Serbian First League players
RFK Grafičar Beograd players